The 2011–12 season was Queens Park Rangers's 123rd professional season and their fifth season in the Premier League. The club competed in the Premier League for the first time in fifteen years, following their promotion as champions from The Championship in 2010–11. The club finished the season in 17th place, avoiding relegation by one point on the final day of the season.

First-team squad
Squad at end of season

First team squad
Ages as of 13 May 2012.

Transfers

In

Out

Loans in

Loans out

Season statistics

Premier League table

Results summary

Results by match

Pre-season

Trofeo Bortolotti 

The Trofeo Bortolotti is a triangular tournament, with each match lasting for 45 minutes.

Competitions

Premier League

FA Cup

League Cup

Player statistics

Appearances, goals and discipline

Goalscorers

Clean sheets

Notes

References

Queens Park Rangers F.C. seasons
Queens Park Rangers Fc Season, 2011-12
Queens Park Rangers Fc Season, 2011-12
Queens Park Rangers